Patrycja Polak (born ) is a Polish volleyball player. She was part of the Poland women's national volleyball team.

She participated in the 2013 FIVB Volleyball World Grand Prix.
On club level she played for Impel Volleyball in 2013.

References

External links
 Profile at FIVB.org

1991 births
Living people
Polish women's volleyball players
Place of birth missing (living people)